Paweł Janas (born 4 March 1953) is a Polish football manager and former footballer.

Career

Club
He began his playing career for the Włókniarz Pabianice team in 1965, but later left the club in 1973.

National team
From 1976 to 1984, he won 53 international caps for Poland. Janas played at centre-back in all seven of Poland's games at the 1982 World Cup in Spain where the team achieved an unexpected third place.

Manager career
Janas' coaching career started as an assistant at Legia Warszawa in 1988. He later ended his work at Legia Warszawa in 1990, and took up a post helping Władysław Stachurski lead the Polish youth squad. He was assistant to Janusz Wójcik at the 1992 Summer Olympics in Barcelona where Poland won the silver medal. In the same year he again became Wójcik's assistant, this time at Legia.

From 1994 to 1996, Janas was the head coach at Legia where he and his team won the Championship (1994, 1995), Polish Cup (1994, 1995), Polish Supercup (1994), as well as advanced to the quarter finals of the UEFA Champions' Cup (1995–96 season).

From 1996 to 1999, Janas coached the Polish youth/Olympic squad, which advanced to the quarter finals of the European Championships. From 1999 he worked as the manager and vice-president of sport at Amica Wronki until 2002.

On 20 December 2002, he officially took charge of the Polish national team. He was heavily criticized in the beginning of his national team spell, despite achieving good results. Nonetheless, under Janas the Poland team qualified for the 2006 World Cup, finishing second in a qualifying group behind England. They qualified as the best second placed team, scoring 27 goals in the qualifiers, 10 more than the group leaders England.

In the final tournament, Poland were drawn with Ecuador, hosts Germany and Costa Rica. Their first game, against Ecuador in Gelsenkirchen, ended in a disappointing 2–0 defeat, and Janas received criticism from the Polish press for his team selection and tactics, which involved leaving striker Maciej Zurawski alone and unsupported up front. He played a 4–5–1 formation, which he said "safety first". Poland played well with 4–4–2 in the qualifiers, which resulted in flowing football.

Poland played much better in their second game, against the Germans in Dortmund, but again lost, this time 1–0 to a late goal by Oliver Neuville, despite a magnificent performance by their goalkeeper Artur Boruc. This meant that the third match, against Costa Rica in Hamburg, was meaningless; Poland won 2–1 with two goals by defender Bartosz Bosacki. Janas was sacked from his post by the Polish FA after the tournament.

In 2008, he became manager of Ekstraklasa side GKS Bełchatów, leading them to a 5th place standing at the half-way point of the 2008–09 season but resigned during the winter break, citing lack of squad depth which would not allow the team to challenge for a higher position.

In January 2009, he accepted the managerial position at Widzew Łódź. In June, the club won the second division but was not allowed to advance by the PZPN. After winning the title again in 2010, Janas decided to leave the club in June.

In September, he became a manager at Polonia Warszawa.

In August 2013, he was appointed as manager at Bytovia Bytów. On 24 May 2014 his club was promoted to Polish I liga.

References

External links

 

1953 births
Living people
Ekstraklasa players
People from Pabianice
Polish footballers
Poland international footballers
Widzew Łódź players
Legia Warsaw players
AJ Auxerre players
Ligue 1 players
Expatriate footballers in France
Polish football managers
Legia Warsaw managers
Polonia Warsaw managers
Widzew Łódź managers
GKS Bełchatów managers
Poland national football team managers
1982 FIFA World Cup players
2006 FIFA World Cup managers
Amica Wronki managers
Sportspeople from Łódź Voivodeship
Association football defenders
Lechia Gdańsk managers